FOBT may refer to:

 Faecal occult blood test, used to detect colon cancer and other disease
 Fixed odds betting terminal, an electromechanical gambling machine
 Fear of buying the top, the fear of buying at the highest prices of a market